Scranton High School may refer to:

Arkansas 
Scranton High School (Arkansas), Scranton, Arkansas

Iowa 
 Scranton High School (Iowa), Scranton, Iowa

North Dakota 
Scranton High School (North Dakota), Scranton, North Dakota

Pennsylvania 
Scranton High School (Pennsylvania), Scranton, Pennsylvania
Scranton Preparatory School, Scranton, Pennsylvania
West Scranton High School, Scranton, Pennsylvania

See also 
 Scranton (disambiguation)